Father Guillaume Mazeas (1720 — 1775) was a translator of English scientific works into French, a corresponding member of the French Academy of Sciences, and a fellow of the Royal Society. He was canon of the cathedral of Vannes, France. He corresponded with Stephen Hales on scientific matters, including his experiences with the lightning rod invented by Benjamin Franklin. His investigations of red dyeing in the East Indies and their improvement in France were of significant industrial value.

References

Writers from Vannes
18th-century French physicists
18th-century French chemists
18th-century French geologists
Fellows of the Royal Society
Members of the French Academy of Sciences
1720 births
1775 deaths